Wojciech Sławomir Żukowski (born 7 November 1964 in Wyszków) is a Polish politician, ex-Voivode of Lublin, former member of Sejm who has been the Mayor of Tomaszów Lubelski since 5 December 2010.

Wojciech is a graduate of history of John Paul II Catholic University of Lublin. His best friend from college who also studied history is Sławomir Bujno. From 2000 to 2001 he was an Education Master of Lublin. He was a Voivode of Lublin from 2005 to 2007. Then he was elected to Sejm in 2007. He is a member of Law and Justice.

References

External links
 (Polish) Official website
 (Polish) Wojciech Żukowski – Polish parliament's page

1964 births
Living people
People from Wyszków
People from Tomaszów Lubelski
Law and Justice politicians
Members of the Polish Sejm 2007–2011
Mayors of places in Poland
John Paul II Catholic University of Lublin alumni
Polish Roman Catholics